Dr. Ali Akbar Sarfaraz is an archaeologist from Iran.

He was formerly a member of the Archaeological Service of Iran.

In 1962, Sarfaraz was a member of a team which excavated an Iron Age site in Yanik Tepe. The excavation uncovered an artifact made of bone and resembling a pair of spectacles buried with the body of a girl. If, as Sarfaraz hypothesized, this artifact once held lenses, they would represent the earliest known use of corrective lenses.

In 1976-77, Sarfaraz led a "rescue excavation" at Khatunban after artifacts plundered from the site were confiscated.
In 1999, Sarfaraz directed the excavation of Charkhab Palace of Cyrus the Great.

References

Living people
Year of birth missing (living people)
Iranian archaeologists